Westringia parvifolia is a species of plant in the mint family that is endemic to Australia.

Description
The species grows as a shrub to about 1 m in height. The tiny oval leaves are about 1.5–3 mm long and 1 mm wide, appearing in whorls of three. The flowers occur in the upper leaf axils and are white to pale purple in colour with small reddish spots.

Distribution and habitat
The species has a limited range, straddling the state border from the vicinity of Yelarbon and Inglewood in south-eastern Queensland, to the Yetman district of northern New South Wales. It grows on sandy and stony soils in association with mallee box and green mallee trees as well as spinifex hummocks.

Conservation
The species has been listed as Vulnerable under Australia's EPBC Act. Potential threats include land clearing, hydrological change, and pollution.

References

parvifolia
Lamiales of Australia
Flora of New South Wales
Flora of Queensland
Taxa named by Cyril Tenison White
Taxa named by William Douglas Francis
Plants described in 1921